Leonard West (by 1518 – 1578) was an English politician.

He was a Member (MP) of the Parliament of England for New Shoreham in April 1554.

References

1587 deaths
English MPs 1554
Year of birth uncertain